Hôtel électrique (also released in Spanish as) is a 1908 silent French comedy-fantasy film directed by Segundo de Chomón and produced by Pathé Frères. The short appears to be inspired by the 1907 American short film The Haunted Hotel.

Plot
Laure and Bertrand arrive at the Electric Hotel, where a control board allows inanimate objects to come to life. For most of the film, the effects are used to perform tasks such as polishing shoes, styling hair and putting away luggage, to the two guests' great pleasure. At the end, a drunken concierge erratically throws switches that cause the system to go haywire, sending all of the hotel's furniture into a jumbled, chaotic mess.

Background
The film displays one of the earliest uses of stop motion animation in history, though it is not de Chomón's first try at this technique: his 1906 film, Le théâtre de Bob, uses animated puppets. However, Hôtel électrique is also an early use of pixilation.

Cast
 Segundo de Chomón as Bertrand
 Julienne Mathieu as Laure

References

3. Smith, Dominic (2019). "The Electric Hotel". Published by Sarah Crichton Books; Farrar, Straus, and Giroux. .

External links
 
 

1908 films
1908 animated films
1900s fantasy comedy films
1900s science fiction films
1900s stop-motion animated films
French fantasy comedy films
Films directed by Segundo de Chomón
Films using stop-motion animation
French silent short films
Spanish fantasy comedy films
Spanish short films
Spanish silent films
1900s rediscovered films
Spanish black-and-white films
French black-and-white films
Spanish science fiction films
Rediscovered French films
Silent comedy films
Silent science fiction films